Watsco, Inc. is the largest distributor of air conditioning, heating and refrigeration equipment, and related parts and supplies (HVAC/R) in the United States. Watsco was founded more than 60 years ago as a manufacturer of parts, components, and tools used in the HVAC/R industry. From 1973 to 1988 Watsco, under the leadership of its current CEO, Albert H. Nahmad, grew from US$5 million in revenues to US$25 million. In 1989, the company shifted its goals from manufacturing to distribution, by acquiring Gemaire Distributors Inc., a South Florida-based Rheem distributor. By 1997, Watsco added other OEMs to the mix, and moved into commercial refrigeration, as a result of the acquisition of Baker Distributing Company. Watsco divested its manufacturing business in 1998, selling it to International Comfort Products Corporation, now part of Carrier Corporation (Carrier). Revenues increased from US$64.1 million in 1989 to US$6.3 billion in 2021 via a strategy of acquiring companies with established market positions and subsequently building revenues and profit through a combination of adding locations, products, services, and other initiatives.

Watsco's main focus is to build a network of locations across North America, that provide the finest and best service, and product availability for HVAC/R contractors, assisting and supporting them as they serve both homeowners and businesses. Watsco has approximately 6,900 employees, assisting approximately 120,000 contractors and dealers working in turn, service, repair, or replace of HVAC/R systems in homes and businesses. As of December 31, 2021, the company operated out of 671 locations in 42 states of the USA, Canada, Mexico and Puerto Rico with the additional export market to Latin America and the Caribbean. Watsco is the only publicly trading HVAC/R distributor. The company's Common stock is traded under the symbol WSO on the New York Stock Exchange (NYSE). The company's Class B common stock is traded on the NYSE under the ticker symbol WSO.B.  Albert Nahmad, Chairman and CEO, and Aaron Nahmad, President, control the company with 52% of the aggregate combined voting power.

Key dates 
1947:  The company, Wagner Tool & Supply Corp., is founded in New York
1956:  Watsco, Inc. incorporated in Florida
1963:  The company goes public
1968:  Watsco joins the American Stock Exchange
1972:  Albert H. Nahmad becomes chairman, president and CEO
1989:  Watsco acquires an 80% interest in Gemaire in Florida and shifts focus to distribution
1990:  The company acquires a 50.5% interest in Heating & Cooling Supply in California
1993:  Watsco acquires an 80% interest in Comfort Supply in Texas
1994:  Watsco moves to the New York Stock Exchange
1996:  Watsco purchases minority interests of Gemaire, Heating & Cooling & Comfort Supply
1997:  The company acquires locations from Carrier and ICP; enters refrigeration market 
1998:  Watsco sells its manufacturing operation; revenues reach US$1 billion
2005:  The company acquires East Coast Metal Distributors, a distributor of Goodman products
2009:  Watsco forms first joint venture with Carrier Corporation; revenues reach US$2 billion
2011:  The company enters Mexico
2012:  Watsco enters Canada and revenues exceed US$3 billion
2015:  The company's revenues reach US$4 billion
2019:  Watsco expanded its presence in the Northeast
2020:  The company's revenues reach US$5 billion

Company history

Organization and development of the company 

Watsco was organized in 1947 in New York, as a parts manufacturer, originally known as Wagner Tool & Supply Corp. Watsco, Inc. was incorporated in Florida on July 14, 1956 and went public in 1963. In 1968, Watsco was listed on the NYSE MKT LLC, formerly known as the American Stock Exchange. In 1969, Watsco merged with Sun Engineering, and began its acquisition strategy.

A small player through the 1970s 

After 1969, Watsco bought several small companies in different industries and scattered locations. Headquartered in Hialeah, Florida, an industrial area in greater Miami, the company operated principally in three industries in the 1970s: 1) the manufacture of climate control components for the heating, air conditioning, and refrigeration industry; 2) the manufacture of components for doors and windows in the building industry; and 3) the production and sale of professional hair care products for the beauty salon industry. In 1971, Watsco acquired Chicago-based Wabash Corp., and Kesco Products of New York. The company acquired Allin Manufacturing Company in 1973, a Chicago-based manufacturer of specialty air conditioning components called “sight glasses” (devices used to observe the clarity of refrigerants). In 1974, the company bought Mumma Tool & Die Company. In 1977, Watsco paid Clairol, Inc. approximately US$275,000 for its Sybil Ives Division, which included hair care products such as permanent waves, hair sprays, hair coloring, shampoos, and conditioners. Watsco's Professional Hair Care division, consisting of Sybil Ives and Winslow Manufacturing, Inc., was working until 1982. In a profile on Watsco in Florida Trend magazine (October 1992), the company's sales and earnings throughout the 1970s were characterized as “unspectacular.” The company in many ways fits the model of the corporate conglomerate, that dominated that era, with operations spread across several market segments—hair care and air conditioning could hardly be more different.

The company came under the control of a new leader in December 1972, Albert H. Nahmad, when he acquired a controlling interest in the company from its founder, William Wagner. He became chairman, president, and chief executive officer, and eventually took the company in a new direction. Nahmad had a background both in business and in engineering. He earned a Bachelor of Science degree in Mechanical Engineering from the University of New Mexico, and a Master of Science degree in Industrial Administration from Purdue University. He then worked for several years for the conglomerate W.R. Grace & Co., and for the accounting firm Arthur Young & Co. (now known as Ernst & Young). For several years, Nahmad's leadership at Watsco did not create lasting positive change: the company continued merging smaller manufacturing firms, including Del Mar Engineering Co. in 1977, Rho Sigma, Inc. in 1979 and Cam-Stat, Inc. of Los Angeles in 1981. In 1982 the company sold its Professional Hair Care division for US$540,000, nearly twice what it had paid for the Clairol division five years earlier. In addition, Nahmad made several moves to strengthen Watsco's operations. In 1982, Watsco's Los Angeles-based subsidiaries Del Mar Engineering and Rho Sigma moved to Hialeah, where they became part of the Production Enterprises division. In 1984, another California subsidiary, Cam-Stat, also moved to Hialeah, so that Watsco's operations were not so far-flung. The company also made a significant investment in 1982, buying an approximate 8.5% interest in Florida Commercial Banks, Inc., a bank holding company, for approximately US$3 million. Two years later, Watsco sold its interest in the bank for approximately US$8.6 million.

Beginning to move in the 1980s 

By the mid-1980s, Watsco's revenues had grown to approximately US$14 million. Watsco's air conditioning business was successfully developing. The U.S. Sun Belt had seen a boom in housing in the 1970s as many people migrated south, and Watsco continued to thrive, even as the boom flattened, because it sold replacement parts. Air conditioners, used almost year-round in the Sun Belt, usually wore out within 8–10 years, so the replacement cycle was in full swing in the 1980s even as new home construction slowed. By 1986, Nahmad was anxious to expand Watsco, which had considerable cash to invest. Nahmad made it known that he was looking for acquisitions, and even took out an advertisement in The Wall Street Journal asking people with companies to sell to contact him. Then Watsco took an unexpected step. Its first major acquisition of the mid-1980s was not related to its air conditioning business any more than hair care had been. In May 1988, Watsco acquired a temporary help and permanent placement services firm called Dunhill Personnel System, Inc. Dunhill had revenue of roughly US$21 million annually, and personnel services was expected to be a high growth business. Nahmad first announced that he would spin off the division for a profit within a few years, but Dunhill continued to be a part of Watsco through 2007 when it was sold to ATS Group LLC. In 1988, Watsco revenues reached US$22 million.

Entry into HVAC distribution 

The real key to Watsco's growth, and the foundation that would be built upon thereafter, came in 1989 when Watsco invested in an air conditioning distribution business. In 1989, Watsco bought 80% of the largest distributor of central air conditioning equipment under the Rheem brand name, Gemaire Distributors, Inc., for US$17.1 million. The other 20% of the company was held by Rheem. Then in 1990, Watsco bought a 50.5% interest in Heating & Cooling Supply, Inc., the largest independent distributor of HVAC equipment and supplies in California. Watsco had planned to buy 80% of Heating & Cooling Supply, raising money through a public stock offering. Iraq's invasion of Kuwait and the possibility of war in the Persian Gulf flattened the stock market, making Watsco's stock offering virtually impossible, and the company withdrew it. Instead Watsco settled for a smaller piece of Heating & Cooling Supply, paying approximately US$16 million for a 50.5% interest. Rheem bought the remaining 49.5%. The acquisition allowed Watsco to double its share of the distribution market in southern California and Arizona, and company revenues shot up. By 1991 Watsco's revenues had reached US$169 million.

Steady growth in the 1990s 

A long-term replacement cycle was underway in the Sun Belt for central air conditioners following the housing boom in the Sun Belt during the 1970s. Watsco also grew by expanding into new, high-growth markets. It opened a location in Las Vegas in 1991, anticipating vigorous population growth there. The company also benefited from the rebuilding effort in the wake of Hurricane Andrew. The hurricane devastated southern Florida in 1992 and in Miami-Dade County alone, about 26,000 homes were destroyed and more than 101,000 others were damaged.

As Watsco's distribution business took off, its manufacturing business became a smaller portion of its total business. By 1993, about three quarters of the company's revenues came from distribution. Manufacturing was profitable and Watsco began manufacturing electronic temperature controls, which it sold to OEMs. Watsco also began making a new product in 1992, which it called the Flash. The Flash was a machine that captured and filtered chlorofluorocarbons (CFCs), the coolant commonly used in air conditioners and refrigeration equipment. The Flash was manufactured by a Watsco subsidiary in Hialeah, and it was important because the Clean Air Act enacted in July 1992 prohibited the release of CFCs into the air. The Flash made it possible for air conditioning contractors to recover and recycle CFCs in compliance with the law. With this new product, Watsco hoped that its manufacturing business would equal the distribution side by the end of the decade.

But it was the distribution business that continued to lead the way through the 1990s. The industry was still highly fragmented, made up of many small, well-established players, and Watsco had many opportunities to expand by acquisition. “There’s no one out there consolidating in the industry except us,” CEO Nahmad told the Wall Street Journal (June 20, 1994). In that interview Nahmad also announced that Watsco's profit for 1994 was expected to go up by about 20%. The company moved to the more prestigious New York Stock Exchange that year. In 1995, Watsco acquired Central Air Conditioning Distributors, Inc., a North Carolina Rheem distributor. In 1996, Watsco bought out Rheem's minority interest in the three Rheem-brand distributors: 1) Gemaire, 2) Heating & Cooling Supply and 3) Comfort Supply, a 1993 acquisition that they had split 80/20. These all became wholly owned subsidiaries of Watsco. The company also bought Three States Supply Company, Inc. that year. Then in early 1997, Watsco acquired Coastline Distribution, Inc. and purchased four additional operations from Inter-City Products Corporation for US$21.7 million. Inter-City was one of the nation's largest manufacturers of heating and cooling equipment, with several major brands, including Comfortmaker and Arcoaire. It had 25 locations of its Coastline Distribution business, spread throughout Florida, Georgia, Alabama, the Carolinas, Maryland and parts of southern California. Within a couple months, Watsco announced that it was buying two distribution operations from the air conditioner maker Carrier. This was the company's 15th acquisition in the HVAC/R distribution business since 1989.

With the distribution business growing so quickly, Watsco decided to sell off its manufacturing business. In January 1998, the company announced its intention to focus solely on its distribution business, which generated approximately 90% of total revenues in 1997. It sold its manufacturing subsidiary, Watsco Components, Inc., to International Comfort Products Corporation in 1998. Watsco continued to acquire smaller distributors in 1998 buying a Georgia firm that distributed heaters and air conditioners to the mobile home industry. Kaufman Supply, Inc. had annual revenues of US$102 million, and looked to have a lucrative niche in the thriving mobile home market in the Southeast U.S.

By the late 1990s, Watsco had become a billion-dollar company. It had made significant inroads into the HVAC/R distribution market in Florida, Texas and California, key Sun Belt states. In 1999, the company announced that it was ready to move into New England, which was new territory for Watsco. New England was served by some 40 different distributors, and the total market for heating and cooling, including parts and supplies, was estimated to be worth more than US$400 million. In 1999, Watsco bought two major distributors in the Northeast, Homans Associates, Inc. and Heat, Inc., and declared that it was actively looking for more acquisitions in the area. Watsco finished 1999 with 315 distribution locations in its network and record growth; revenues grew 17%, to US$1.25 billion. Watsco was now the largest independent distributor of residential heating and cooling equipment in the U.S.

Improved operating efficiencies and continued growth in the 2000s 

In 2000, the company entered another mode, concentrating on improving operating efficiency and enhancing profitability in its existing locations instead of focusing on growth through acquisitions. It announced that it would eliminate some product lines that were not selling well or that had poor profit margins. Watsco also implemented several initiatives including the closure of certain underperforming locations (25 locations closed in 2000 and 7 closed in 2001) and the integration of operating subsidiaries, which resulted in a more simplified operating structure. The company looked for other ways to cut costs too. It restructured the business it had bought from Kaufman Supply, which sold heating and cooling to mobile homes and other manufactured housing. Watsco also invested in new technology in the early 2000s by introducing ACDoctor.com, a consumer-friendly website that provides consumers a resource for heating and air conditioning, including information on energy efficiency, product comparisons and tax and utility credits, as well as a way to find a licensed HVAC contractor to service their repair and replacement needs. Watsco reported sales of US$1.3 billion in 2000, up slightly from the previous year. Revenues for 2001 shrank slightly yet Watsco still saw opportunities for future growth in the HVAC/R distribution market. Company analysts perceived the HVAC/R distribution industry as undercapitalized and fragmented, suggesting there was still a place for a well-heeled consolidator.

Watsco continued its acquisition strategy in the 2000s acquiring a number of other businesses including 52 locations from a former competitor, Pameco, in 2003. It also acquired Goodman Manufacturing's largest distributor, East Coast Metal Distributors, Inc., in 2005 with 27 locations in the Southeast. East Coast had been owned by the same family for more than 50 years. Watsco then acquired Houston-based ACR Group, Inc. in 2007, a public company with 54 locations throughout the Sun Belt and annual revenues of approximately US$240 million. Despite the economic slowdown that began in 2008, Watsco completed its largest acquisition to date with the formation of a joint venture with Carrier in the second half of 2009.

Joint ventures with Carrier Global Corporation 

In July 2009, Watsco formed a joint venture (Carrier Enterprise I) with Carrier to distribute Carrier products throughout the U.S. Sun Belt, Latin America and the Caribbean. Carrier contributed to Carrier Enterprise 95 locations in the U.S. Sunbelt and Puerto Rico and Carrier's export division located in Miami, Florida, and Watsco contributed 15 locations that distributed Carrier products. Watsco purchased a 60% controlling interest in the joint venture for US$181 million with options to purchase up to an additional 20% interest from Carrier (10% beginning in July 2012 and an additional 10% in July 2014).

This represented a transformational event in Watsco's history. The transaction doubled Watsco's already market-leading position and expanded its product lines and brands. The company was also able to expand its presence in the U.S. Sun Belt, where its products are of critical importance. In particular, Carrier Enterprise added product depth to Watsco's markets with premium level residential products, commercial products and the latest energy-efficient technology. Likewise, Carrier Enterprise locations were provided the opportunity to sell additional parts, supplies and other complementary accessories through its existing operating structure, leveraging existing customer relationships and costs. Carrier Enterprise is structured similar to Watsco's other acquisitions, with a decentralized management structure that keeps the existing management team in place; a cornerstone of Watsco's operating philosophy. The Carrier Enterprise joint venture resulted in an expansion of Watsco's revenues by approximately US$1.3 billion in 2010. “For its part, Carrier found a powerful new partner with extensive distribution expertise that would expand sales of its product lines.”

Effective July 2, 2012, Watsco exercised their first option to acquire an additional 10% ownership interest in Carrier Enterprise I, which increased the company's ownership interest to 70%. On July 1, 2014, Watsco exercised their last remaining option to acquire an additional 10% ownership interest in Carrier Enterprise I, which increased the company's ownership interest to 80%. The export division, Carrier InterAmerica Corporation, redomesticated from the U.S. Virgin Islands to Delaware effective December 31, 2019, following which Carrier InterAmerica Corporation became a separate operating entity in which Watsco has an 80% controlling interest and Carrier has a 20% non-controlling interest. On August 1, 2019, Carrier Enterprise I acquired substantially all of the HVAC assets and assumed certain of the liabilities of Peirce-Phelps, Inc., an HVAC distributor operating from 19 locations in Pennsylvania, New Jersey, and Delaware. 

In April 2011, Watsco formed a second joint venture with Carrier, Carrier Enterprise II, to distribute Carrier products throughout the Northeast U.S. in largely new markets for the company. In July 2011, the company added Carrier's distribution operations in Mexico to the second joint venture. In November 2016, Watsco purchased an additional 10% ownership interest in Carrier Enterprise II, and, on February 13, 2017, again purchased an additional 10% ownership interest in Carrier Enterprise II, which together increased their controlling interest to 80%. Effective May 31, 2019, Watsco purchased an additional 20% ownership interest in Homans Associates II LLC (“Homans”) from Carrier Enterprise II, following which Watsco owned 100% of Homans. Homans previously operated as a division of Carrier Enterprise II and now operates as one of Watsco's stand-alone, wholly owned subsidiaries. 

In April 2012, 
Watsco formed a third joint venture, Carrier Enterprise III, with UTC Canada Corporation, an affiliate of Carrier, to distribute Carrier products from 35 locations throughout all of the provinces and territories in Canada. Watsco has a 60% controlling interest in this joint venture and UTC Canada has a 40% noncontrolling interest.

In April 2021, Watsco acquired certain assets and assumed certain liabilities comprising the HVAC distribution business of Temperature Equipment Corporation, an HVAC distributor operating from 28 locations in Illinois, Indiana, Kansas, Michigan, Minnesota, Missouri and Wisconsin. The Company formed a new, stand-alone joint venture with Carrier, TEC Distribution LLC (“TEC”), that operates this business. Watsco has an 80% controlling interest in TEC, and Carrier has a 20% non-controlling interest.  

Combined, the joint ventures with Carrier represented 56%  of Watsco's revenues for 2021.

Growth of distribution operations

Residential HVAC distribution industry 

The HVAC/R distribution industry is highly fragmented with approximately 6,700 distribution companies. The industry in the U.S. and Canada is well-established, having had its primary period of growth during the post-World War II era with the advent of affordable central air conditioning and heating systems for both residential and commercial applications. The advent of HVAC/R products in Latin America and the Caribbean is also well-established, but has emerged in more recent years as those economies have grown and products have become more affordable and have matured from luxury to necessity.
The estimated annual market on an installed basis for residential HVAC/R products in North America is approximately US$120 billion. Residential central air conditioners are manufactured primarily by seven major companies that together account for approximately 90% of all units shipped in the U.S. each year. These companies are: Carrier Global Corporation (Carrier), Goodman Manufacturing Company, L.P. (Goodman), a subsidiary of Daikin Industries, Ltd., Rheem Manufacturing Company (Rheem), Trane Technologies plc, York International Corporation, a subsidiary of Johnson Controls International plc, Lennox International, Inc. and Nortek Global HVAC, LLC, a subsidiary of Nortek, Inc. These manufacturers distribute their products through a combination of factory-owned and independent distributors who, in turn, supply the equipment and related parts and supplies to contractors and dealers nationwide that sell to and install the products for consumers, businesses and other end-users.

Air conditioning and heating equipment is sold to the residential replacement market, the commercial market and residential new construction market. The replacement market has increased in importance over the past several years as a result of the aging of the installed base of residential central air conditioners and furnaces, the introduction of new higher energy efficient models, the remodeling and expansion of existing homes, the addition of central air conditioning to homes that previously had only heating products and consumers’ overall unwillingness to live without air conditioning or heating products. The mechanical life of central air conditioning and furnaces varies by geographical region due to usage and ranges from approximately 8 to 20 years. According to data published by the Energy Information Administration in 2018, there are approximately 91 million central air conditioning and heating systems installed in the U.S. that have been in service for more than 10 years. Many installed units are currently reaching the end of their useful lives, thus providing a growing and stable replacement market.

Acquisition strategy 

The company focuses on acquiring businesses that either complement its current presence in existing markets or establish a presence in new geographic markets. Since 1989, Watsco has acquired 66 HVAC/R distribution businesses, some of which operate as primary operating subsidiaries. The other smaller acquired distributors have been integrated into or are under the management of the primary operating subsidiaries.

Products 

The products the company distributes consist of: (i) equipment, including residential ducted and ductless air conditioners ranging from 1 to 5 tons, gas, electric, and oil furnaces ranging from 50,000 to 150,000 BTUs, commercial air conditioning and heating equipment and systems ranging from 1-1/2 to 25 tons and other specialized equipment, (ii) parts, including replacement compressors, evaporator coils, motors and other component parts, (iii) supplies, including thermostats, insulation material, refrigerants, ductwork, grills, registers, sheet metal, tools, copper tubing, concrete pads, tape, adhesives and other ancillary supplies, and (iv) plumbing and bathroom remodeling supplies in a limited number of stores. The refrigeration products Watsco distributes include condensing units, compressors, evaporators, valves, refrigerant, walk-in coolers and ice machines for industrial and commercial applications.

Distribution and sales 

The largest market Watsco serves is the U.S., in which the most significant markets for HVAC/R products are in the Sun Belt. Accordingly, the majority of Watsco's distribution locations are in the Sun Belt, with the highest concentration in Florida and Texas. These markets have been a strategic focus of the company given their size, the reliance by homeowners and businesses on HVAC/R products to maintain a comfortable indoor environment and the population growth in these areas over the last 40 years, which has led to a substantial installed base requiring replacement, a shorter useful life for equipment given the hours of operation and the focus by electrical utilities on consumer incentives designed to promote replacement of HVAC/R equipment in an effort to improve energy efficiency. In the U.S., cooling and heating accounts for approximately half of the energy consumed in a typical home.

Business units

Baker Distributing Company 
Founded in 1945 in Jacksonville, Florida, Baker provides HVAC, refrigeration, food service equipment, and parts and supplies for residential, commercial and marine applications from more than 200 locations in 24 states.

Carrier Enterprise 
Carrier Enterprise sells a variety of products manufactured by Carrier from more than 160 locations in 23 states, Puerto Rico and on an export basis to the Caribbean and portions of Latin America.

Carrier Enterprise Mexico 
Carrier Enterprise Mexico distributes Carrier's complete product line of HVAC equipment and commercial refrigeration products and supplies servicing both the residential and applied commercial markets from more than 10 locations throughout all of Mexico.

Carrier Enterprise Canada 
Carrier Enterprise Canada distributes Carrier, Bryant and Payne branded residential, light-commercial and applied commercial HVAC products from more than 35 locations throughout all of the territories and provinces in Canada.

East Coast Metal Distributors 
Established in 1954 in Durham, North Carolina, East Coast distributes Amana, Goodman, Daikin and Gree HVAC products from more than 45 locations in 9 states.

Gemaire Distributors 
Founded in 1969 in Florida, Gemaire provides Rheem, American Standard and Mitsubishi HVAC products from more than 110 locations in 13 states.

Homans Associates 
Homans Associates operates from 25 locations in Massachusetts, New York, Maine, New Jersey, Connecticut, New Hampshire, Rhode Island and Vermont.

N&S Supply 
Founded in 1946, N&S Supply operates seven locations in the Hudson Valley of New York and Connecticut.

Peirce-Phelps 
Founded in 1926 in Philadelphia, Pennsylvania, Peirce-Phelps has 19 locations in Pennsylvania, New Jersey and Delaware and their product offering includes residential and commercial HVAC equipment made by Carrier.

TEC Distribution 
Founded in 1935 in Chicago, Illinois, TEC has 28 locations in Illinois, Indiana, Kansas, Michigan, Minnesota, Missouri and Wisconsin and their product offering includes residential, light-commercial and applied HVAC systems made by Carrier.

References 

Companies listed on the New York Stock Exchange
Companies based in Miami